Anthony Losilla (born 10 March 1986) is a French professional footballer who plays as a midfielder for and captains Bundesliga club VfL Bochum.

Career

Career statistics

References

External links
 
 
 Anthony Losilla profile at foot-national.com 

1986 births
Living people
People from Firminy
Sportspeople from Loire (department)
French footballers
Association football midfielders
AS Cannes players
Paris FC players
AS Saint-Étienne players
Stade Lavallois players
Dynamo Dresden players
VfL Bochum players
Ligue 2 players
Championnat National players
2. Bundesliga players
Bundesliga players
French expatriate footballers
Expatriate footballers in Germany
Footballers from Auvergne-Rhône-Alpes